Scandia or Scandza is an early name used for the Scandinavian Peninsula by the first cartographers charting northern Europe.

Scandia may also refer to:

Places
 Scandia, Alberta, a hamlet in southern Alberta, Canada
 Scandia Eastern Irrigation District Museum, an open-air museum in eastern Alberta
 Scandia, Kansas, a city in the United States
 Scandia, Minnesota, a city in the United States
 Scandia Township, Polk County, Minnesota, a township in the United States
 Scandia Trail, Minnesota State Highway 97 
 Scandia Valley Township, Morrison County, Minnesota, a township in the United States
 Scandia, Solano County, California

Science
 An alternate name for scandium oxide, Sc2O3
 Scandia (cnidarian), a genus of hydrozoans in the family Hebellidae
 Scandia (plant), a genus of plants in the family Apiaceae
 Scandia Tholi, a mountain on Mars (a classical albedo feature)

Media
 Scandia (journal), a Scandinavian history periodical

Business
 
 ABB Scandia, a locomotive builder from Denmark 
 Saab 90 Scandia, a 1940s Swedish airliner
 Team Scandia, a defunct Indy Racing League team
 Scandia Amusements, a chain of small scale amusement parks in California

See also
 Scania (disambiguation) 
 Scandiano
 Skandia (disambiguation)